Luis María Cassoni (8 January 1939 – 17 January 2021) was an Argentine politician and pharmacist. He belonged to the Radical Civic Union (UCR) and served as Governor of Misiones Province between September and December of 1987.

Biography
Born in San Javier, Misiones, Cassoni was elected vice governor of Misiones Province in the October 1983 elections, taking office in December of the same year. He took charge of the provincial executive power after the resignation of the then governor, Ricardo Barrios Arrechea, who left office to form part of the cabinet of President Raúl Alfonsín as Minister of Health and Social Welfare.

Between 1988 and 1991, he served as provincial deputy. During his tenure as vice governor, he oversaw the construction of the Urugua-í dam, for which he later faced accusations of surcharges and irregularities.

Death
Cassoni died from COVID-19 on 17 January 2021, in Posadas, Misiones. The government of Misiones extended condolences for his distinguished career and declared mourning.

References

1939 births
2021 deaths 
Governors of Misiones Province
Radical Civic Union politicians
People from Posadas, Misiones
Argentine pharmacists
Vice Governors of Misiones Province
Deaths from the COVID-19 pandemic in Argentina